Erythroxylum novogranatense is a neotropical species of Erythroxylum (Erythroxylaceae). Cocaine is produced from the leaves.

Name
"Novogranatense" is derived from Latin: novo (new) and granatense (Granada). It was named by William Turner Thiselton-Dyer, the third director of Royal Botanic Gardens, Kew, because its country of origin was the Spanish colonial Viceroyalty of New Granada—present day Colombia.

Subspecies
Erythroxylum novogranatense contains 2 subspecies:
Erythroxylum novogranatense var. novogranatense (D.Morris) Hieron
Erythroxylum novogranatense var. truxillense (Rusby) Plowman
These two subspecies are phenotypically similar, but morphologically distinguishable.

Taxonomy
Among the genus Erythroxylum, cocaine-rich leaves are obtained from 4 taxa: 
Erythroxylum coca var. coca
Erythroxylum coca var. ipadu
Erythroxylum novogranatense var. novogranatense
Erythroxylum novogranatense var. truxillense

Erythroxylum novogranatense was originally identified as E. coca, subsequently described as a variety, and finally came to be recognized as its own species.

Erythroxylum novogranatense var. novogranatense is native to Colombia and Venezuela. Unlike Erythroxylum coca, it tolerates non-acidic soils. Its adaptability and easy propagation has led to a wide distribution over the Old World and New World tropics. It was introduced in Bogor (West Java, Indonesia) in 1875, and by 1888 large quantities of seed were already being distributed in South-East Asia. It has been grown in Peninsular Malaysia, western and eastern Java (Indonesia), northern Borneo (Indonesia), northern Sulawesi (Indonesia) and the Philippines (Luzon).

Cocaine content
In an extensive study, the cocaine content in leaves of E. coca var. coca (30 samples) was found to range from 0.23-0.96%, with a mean of 0.63%, while the cocaine content in E. coca var. ipadu (6 samples) was lower: 0.11-0.41%, with an average of 0.25%.  E. novogranatense var. novogranatense (3 samples) contained 0.55-0.93% cocaine, with an average of 0.77% and E. novogranatense var. truxillense (14 samples) 0.42-1.02%, with a mean of 0.72%.

Ecology
Erythroxylum novogranatense is a highland variety that is utilized in lowland areas. It is cultivated in drier regions in South America, where it requires irrigation. However, E. novogranatense is very adaptable to varying ecological conditions, and grows well in both humid and dry areas, and at low and higher altitudes.

Environmental effects on the cocaine concentration in the leaves were smaller, so that total cocaine production per plant was largely a function of leaf mass, with environmental conditions that stimulated leaf growth giving higher cocaine yields. Both species grow on soils with low pH, and a greenhouse study has shown that the optimum pH for biomass accumulation of E. novogranatense is between 4.7 and 6.0.

Propagation and planting
Erythroxylum novogranatense var. novogranatense, E. novogranatense var. truxillense and E. coca var. coca have to be reproduced by seed, because vegetative propagation is difficult. However, E. coca var. ipadu does not produce seed and is produced by stem cuttings. It cannot reproduce without human interference. Cultivated E. novogranatense var. novogranatense produces abundant seed and is easy to propagate. Seed viability decreases rapidly. The actual time of transplanting and the spacing of the plants varies with climatic factors and whether coca is interplanted or cultivated as a sole crop.

Coca farmers in South America, when collecting their seeds, pour them into a container of water; the seeds that float are discarded as they are non-viable.

Identification

The basic physical difference between E. coca and E. novogranatense is that the E. coca (sometimes called E. bolivianum) has larger leaves that are elliptical, oval and broader near the middle (broad-elliptic) and darker green color above. The E. novogranatense has smaller, narrower leaves, broadest near the apex (oblong-obovate), and bright green color above. To identify E. novogranatense var. novogranatense from E. novogranatense var. truxillense: The leaves of E. novogranatense var. truxillense does not possess parallel lines either side of the central vein like all other varieties.

Harvesting
The first harvest of coca takes place at 1–3 years after transplanting. In the Island of Java (Indonesia), a first harvest can be expected within a year after transplanting. The leaves have to be stiff and easily detachable to be harvested. Leaves can be harvested every 50–60 days in the rainy season, but when it is drier, they are usually harvested every 3–4 months. The leaves should be pinched from the plant, not ripped off.

References

 Plant Resources of South-East Asia 12(3) Medicinal and Poisonous Plants 3: R.H.M.J. Lemmens, N. Bunyapraphatsara (Eds.); Backhuys Publishers, Leiden, 2003, 664 pages,

Further reading

External links
The Dutch Colonial Coca Boom, 1905-1930

novogranatense
Coca
Flora of Colombia
Flora of Venezuela
Crops originating from South America
Crops originating from indigenous Americans
Viceroyalty of New Granada